Robbie Horn (born 3 August 1977) is a Scottish former professional football player and is the current manager of Bonnyrigg Rose Athletic.

Horn played for Heart of Midlothian, Cowdenbeath, Forfar Athletic and Berwick Rangers in the Scottish Football League.

After a stint as manager of Vale of Leithen, Horn assisted Colin Cameron at Berwick. He was appointed manager of junior club Bonnyrigg Rose Athletic in June 2015. Horn led Bonnyrigg to the East Super League championship in 2015–16. Bonnyrigg then reached the fourth round of the 2016–17 Scottish Cup, where they lost 8–1 to cup holders Hibernian.

Horn was appointed manager of Berwick Rangers in August 2017. He resigned from this position in October 2018, with the club in second-bottom place in the 2018–19 Scottish League Two table.

Horn returned to former club Bonnyrigg Rose after leaving Berwick and would go on to lead the club to the East of Scotland title and promotion to the Lowland League. Horn then led Bonnyrigg to the SPFL, winning promotion to Scottish League Two in 2022 by winning the Lowland League and a playoff against Cowdenbeath.

Managerial statistics

References

External links

1977 births
Living people
Scottish footballers
Heart of Midlothian F.C. players
Cowdenbeath F.C. players
Forfar Athletic F.C. players
Berwick Rangers F.C. players
Scottish Football League players
Association football central defenders
Scotland under-21 international footballers
Footballers from Edinburgh
Scottish football managers
Scottish Professional Football League managers
Bonnyrigg Rose Athletic F.C. managers
Vale of Leithen F.C.
Berwick Rangers F.C. managers
Scottish Junior Football Association managers
Lowland Football League managers